The 2010–11 Adelaide United FC season was the club's sixth A-League season. It includes the 2010–11 A-League season as well as any other competitions of the 2010–11 football season, including the 2010 AFC Champions League. Adelaide United competed in the continental competition for its third time, making the club the most successful Australian club in Asia.

Overview 
For the first time in the club's history, the Adelaide United will be managed by an international manager in Rini Coolen, moving away from the Adelaide United tradition of local coaches seen in its prior seasons.

As of 9 September 2010, Adelaide United has made Australian football history by becoming the first team to climb from the bottom of the table to the top, whilst the 2009–10 premiers and champions, Sydney FC, remain rooted at the bottom. Adelaide United also claimed the record for longest undefeated streak in A-League history with their win over Wellington Phoenix in Week 11 of the league, consisting of thirteen games stretching back to the penultimate round of the 2009–10 A-League season. This surpasses Central Coast Mariners's previous record of twelve games undefeated set back in the 2005–06 A-League season. Unfortunately for Adelaide United, Brisbane Roar surpassed this newly set record, when the Roar comprehensively won their Week 16 fixture against Central Coast Mariners at Bluetongue Stadium.

Following 18 months under Football Federation Australia (FFA) financial administration, it was announced on 8 November 2010 that a South Australian consortium had taken over ownership of the club with a ten-year licence. New co-owner Greg Griffin stepped in as Chairman of the club, whilst North Adelaide Football Club CEO, Glenn Elliott replaced Sam Ciccarello, who then took up a role at the FFA.

During the January 2011 transfer window, Coolen made a move to strengthen United's squad by signing former Uruguayan youth international Francisco Usúcar, and former Dutch international Andwélé Slory. Both have signed until the end of the season and have replaced former imports Lloyd Owusu and Inseob Shin, whose contracts were mutually terminated to allow the transfers to occur early in the year. Cameron Watson was also signed on as a mainstay squad member after his injury replacement contract expired at the end of December. Iain Fyfe, arguably Adelaide's most consistent defender in the season transferred to K-League outfit Busan I'Park for an undisclosed transfer fee, where he will join up with former teammate Shin. As a replacement, Coolen brought in former Croatian youth international Dario Bodrušić to cover in defensive duties.

On 9 January 2011, Adelaide broke its longest winless streak against its rival club Melbourne Victory by posting a 4–1 away win in Melbourne at AAMI Park. Adelaide United then went on to make A-League history by recording the highest winning margin in the league's history with an 8–1 win over North Queensland Fury on 21 January 2011. This also marked the first time two players from the same side scored hat-tricks in one game (Sergio van Dijk and Marcos Flores), and matched the all-time highest match aggregate score of 9 goals scored in one match.

After a form slump in the second half of the season, United saw itself lose 10 of its last 19 games, but rebounded well in the final week of competition by winning 2–1 at Adelaide Oval against Melbourne Victory in front of 21,038 spectators – the club's largest crowd of the season. This ensured the club third place in overall standings at the end of the season, and hosting rights for at least the first week of the knock-out Finals series.

Adelaide United went on to defeat Wellington Phoenix in the first week of the Finals under torrential rain, but succumbed to Gold Coast United in the second week and were knocked out of the competition on the back of a 2–3 home loss.

Awards and recognition 
At the end of the season A-League Awards night, Adelaide midfielder Marcos Flores was awarded the league's most prestigious award, the Johnny Warren Medal. Striker Sergio van Dijk was awarded the league's Golden Boot award, with a total of 17 goals in the season.

Club awards were also presented at the end of the season with defender Cássio awarded his second Club Champion award, edging out teammates Marcos Flores and Sergio van Dijk.

Players

Squad information

First Team 

* Squad list current as of 19 January 2011

Players in / out 

Re-signed

In

Out

Player statistics

Squad stats

Delisted players

Disciplinary records

A-League

AFC Champions League

Scorers

A-League

AFC Champions League

Club

Coaching staff

Managerial Changes

Attendance at home games

Competitions

Pre-season

A-League

Results summary

Results by round

Matches

Finals Series

References

External links 
 Official website
 AFC Champions League 2010 Club Profile

Adelaide United FC seasons